Derbyshire County Cricket Club in 2006 was the cricket season when the English club Derbyshire had been playing for one hundred and thirty-five years. In the County Championship, they finished fifth in the second division. In the Pro40 league, they finished eighth in the second division. They were eliminated at group level in the Cheltenham and Gloucester Trophy and came eighth in the North section of the Twenty20 Cup.

2006 season

Derbyshire was in Division 2 of the County Championship and finished in fifth position. In addition to the Championship, they played Oxford University. Of their eighteen first class games, they won four and lost five, the remainder being drawn. Derbyshire was in Division 2 of the NatWest Pro40 League in which they won one of their eight matches to finish eighth in the division. In the Cheltenham and Gloucester Trophy Derbyshire played in the Northern group, coming fifth in the table.  In the Twenty20 Cup, Derbyshire played in the North Division and won two matches to finish sixth in the division. Graeme Welch was captain and Michael Di Venuto top scorer with three centuries.  Steffan Jones took most wickets.

Matches

First Class
{| class="wikitable" width="90%"
! bgcolor="#efefef" colspan=6 | List of matches
|- bgcolor="#efefef"
!No.
!Date
!V
!Result 
!Margin
!Notes
|-
|1
| 15 Apr 2006
| Oxford University  The University Parks, Oxford 
|bgcolor="#FFCC00"|Drawn
|
|    CR Taylor 102 
|-
|2 
|19 Apr 2006
|  Surrey Kennington Oval 
|bgcolor="#FFCC00"|Drawn
|
|    AG Botha 100; Clarke 130; Mahmood 5-69; MA Sheikh 5-65 
|-
|3 
|29 Apr 2006
| Sri Lankans  County Ground, Derby  
|bgcolor="#FF0000"|Lost 
| 6 wickets
|     
|-
|4 
|3 May 2006
 | Glamorgan   Sophia Gardens, Cardiff  
|bgcolor="#00FF00"|Won 
| 28 runs
|    CR Taylor 121; Cosgrove 114; Powell 100; PS Jones 6-25 
|-
|5 
| 10 May 2006
|  Worcestershire County Ground, New Road, Worcester 
|bgcolor="#00FF00"|Won 
| 35 runs
|    Solanki 110; Khan 6-60; Ali 7-43 
|-
|6 
|17 May 2006
| Leicestershire County Ground, Derby 
|bgcolor="#FFCC00"|Drawn
|
|    SD Stubbings 119; TR Birt 119 
|-
|7 
|24 May 2006
| Northamptonshire  County Ground, Northampton 
|bgcolor="#FFCC00"|Drawn
|
|    Nicholson 106 
|-
|8 
|6 Jun 2006
| Glamorgan   County Ground, Derby 
|bgcolor="#FF0000"|Lost 
| 6 wickets
|    Cosgrove 233; Croft 5-56 
|-
|9 
| 14 Jun 2006
|  Gloucestershire  County Ground, Bristol 
|bgcolor="#FFCC00"|Drawn
|
|    TR Birt 181; CG Taylor 121 
|-
|10 
|20 Jun 2006
| Essex   County Ground, Derby 
|bgcolor="#FF0000"|Lost 
| 8 wickets
|    TR Birt 130; Bichel 6-38 
|-
|11
|14 Jul 2006
| SomersetCounty Ground, Taunton 
|bgcolor="#00FF00"|Won 
| 344 runs
|    MJ North 132; Trego 135; SD Stubbings 124; GG Wagg 6-38 
|-
|12 
|19 Jul 2006
| Leicestershire Grace Road, Leicester 
|bgcolor="#FFCC00"|Drawn
|
|    Hassan Adnan 117; MJ Di Venuto 161; Broad 5-89 
|-
|13 
| 26 Jul 2006
|  Worcestershire Queen's Park, Chesterfield 
|bgcolor="#FFCC00"|Drawn
|
|    Solanki 140; S Davies 107; MJ North 161; Mason 5-49; AG Botha 6-117 
|-
|14
| 8 Aug 2006
| SomersetCounty Ground, Derby 
|bgcolor="#00FF00"|Won 
| 80 runs
|    MJ Di Venuto 118; C White 260 
|-
|15
|17 Aug 2006
|  Gloucestershire  County Ground, Derby 
|bgcolor="#FFCC00"|Drawn
|
|    MJ Di Venuto 104 
|-
|16
|30 Aug 2006
| Northamptonshire  County Ground, Derby 
|bgcolor="#FFCC00"|Drawn
|
|    Rogers 112; Klusener 128; CR Taylor 103 
|-
|17
| 9 Sep 2006
| Essex   County Ground, Chelmsford 
|bgcolor="#FF0000"|Lost 
| Innings and 178 runs
|    Pettini 208; Tudor 144; Flower 136*; Philips 5-41 
|-
|18
| 20 Sep 2006
|  Surrey County Ground, Derby 
|bgcolor="#FF0000"|Lost 
| 5 wickets
|     
|-

NatWest Pro40 League
{| class="wikitable" width="70%"
! bgcolor="#efefef" colspan=6 | List of matches
|- bgcolor="#efefef"
!No.
!Date
!V
!Result 
!Margin
!Notes
 |- 
|1
| 30 Jul 2006
|  Surrey Queen's Park, Chesterfield
|bgcolor="#FF0000"|Lost 
| 8 wickets
|    Brown 106 
|-
|2
|2 Aug 2006
| Yorkshire County Ground, Derby 
|Abandoned
|
|     
|-
|3
|13 Aug 2006
|  Hampshire The Rose Bowl, Southampton  
|bgcolor="#FF0000"|Lost 
| 1 wicket
|    Crawley 100 
|-
|4 
|15 Aug 2006
|  Gloucestershire  County Ground, Derby 
|bgcolor="#FF0000"|Lost 
| 37 runs
|     
|-
|5 
|27 Aug 2006
| Kent St Lawrence Ground, Canterbury  
|bgcolor="#FF0000"|Lost 
| 7 wickets
|     
|-
|6
|3 Sep 2006
|  Worcestershire County Ground, New Road, Worcester 
|bgcolor="#FF0000"|Lost 
| 76 runs
|     
|-
|7
|6 Sep 2006
| SomersetCounty Ground, Derby 
|bgcolor="#00FF00"|Won 
| 7 wickets
|    Hildreth 122; TR Birt 108 
|-
|8
|17 Sep 2006
| Leicestershire Grace Road, Leicester 
 |bgcolor="#FF0000"|Lost 
| 4 wickets
|     
|-

Cheltenham and Gloucester Trophy 
{| class="wikitable" width="70%"
! bgcolor="#efefef" colspan=6 | List of matches
|- bgcolor="#efefef"
!No.
!Date
!V
!Result 
!Margin
!Notes
|-
|1 
|  23 Apr 2006 
| Yorkshire  Headingley, Leeds 
 |bgcolor="#00FF00"|Won 
| 2 runs
|    CR Taylor 100 
|-
|2
|7 May 2006
| Leicestershire County Ground, Derby 
|bgcolor="#00FF00"|Won 
| 5 wickets
|     
|-
|3
|14 May 2006
| Warwickshire  Edgbaston, Birmingham 
|bgcolor="#00FF00"|Won 
| 9 runs
|    PS Jones 5-49 
|-
 |4
|28 May 2006
| Scotland  County Ground, Derby  
|bgcolor="#FF0000"|Lost 
| 8 wickets
|    Watson 108 
|-
 |5
| 29 May 2006
|  Worcestershire County Ground, Derby  
|bgcolor="#00FF00"|Won 
| 7 wickets
|     
|-
|6
| 2 Jun 2006
| Nottinghamshire  County Ground, Derby  
|bgcolor="#FF0000"|Lost 
| 56 runs
|     
|-
|7
|11 Jun 2006
| Lancashire  Old Trafford, Manchester 
|bgcolor="#FF0000"|Lost 
| 9 wickets
|    Loye 120 
|-
|8
|18 Jun 2006
| Northamptonshire  County Ground, Northampton 
 |bgcolor="#FF0000"|Lost 
| 1 run
|    SD Stubbings 110 
|-
|9
| 25 Jun 2006
 | Durham   County Ground, Derby 
|bgcolor="#00FF00"|Won 
| 5 wickets
|    Maher 125; CR Taylor 111 
|-

Other List A
{| class="wikitable" width="70%"
! bgcolor="#efefef" colspan=6 | List of matches
|- bgcolor="#efefef"
!No.
!Date
!V
!Result 
!Margin
!Notes
|-
|1 
| 6 Aug 2006
 | West Indies A   County Ground, Derby 
|bgcolor="#00FF00"|Won 
| 30 runs
|    AG Botha 5-60 
|-

Twenty20 Cup
 {| class="wikitable" width="70%"
! bgcolor="#efefef" colspan=6 | List of matches
|- bgcolor="#efefef"
!No.
!Date
!V
!Result 
!Margin
!Notes
 |-
|1 
 |27 Jun 2006 
| Lancashire  County Ground, Derby 
|bgcolor="#00FF00"|Won 
| 5 wickets
|     
|-
|2
|30 Jun 2006 
| Leicestershire<small> County Ground, Derby </small
|bgcolor="#FF0000"|Lost 
| 86 runs
|     
|-
|3
|3 Jul 2006 
 | Lancashire  Old Trafford, Manchester 
|bgcolor="#FF0000"|Lost 
| 48 runs
|     
|-
|4
 |5 Jul 2006 
| Leicestershire Grace Road, Leicester 
|bgcolor="#FF0000"|Lost 
| 18 runs
|     
|-
|5
 |7 Jul 2006 
| Nottinghamshire  County Ground, Derby  
|bgcolor="#FF0000"|Lost 
| 7 wickets
|     
|-
|6
|8 Jul 2006 
 | Durham   Riverside Ground, Chester-le-Street 
 |bgcolor="#00FF00"|Won 
| 2 runs
|     
|-
|7
 |10 Jul 2006 
| Yorkshire  County Ground, Derby  
|bgcolor="#FFCC00"|No result
|
|     
|-
|8
 |11 Jul 2006 
| Nottinghamshire  Trent Bridge, Nottingham 
|bgcolor="#FF0000"|Lost 
| 9 wickets
|     
|-

Statistics

Competition batting averages

Competition bowling averages

Wicket Keeping
James Pipe 
County Championship 	Catches 39, Stumping 6  
PRO40 Catches 2, Stumping 0 
Friends Provident Catches 8, Stumping 1 
Twenty20 Catches 4, Stumping 3

See also
Derbyshire County Cricket Club seasons
2006 English cricket season

References

2006 in English cricket
Derbyshire County Cricket Club seasons